Ingvild Flugstad Østberg (born 9 November 1990) is a Norwegian cross-country skier who has competed since 2008.

Career
She won her first competition in the sprint event in the Tour de Ski on 31 December 2013. Her previous best individual World Cup finish was a second place at a sprint event on 1 January 2013 held in Val Müstair, Switzerland during Tour de Ski.

She won four gold medals during the 2009 Junior World Championship in Praz de Lys-Sommand, but had to settle for a fifth place in the team sprint event during the 2009 World Championship in Liberec, along with Astrid Jacobsen. She finished 37th in the 30 km event.

At the 2014 Olympic Games in Sochi, she won the team sprint with Marit Bjørgen, and placed second in the individual sprint. In Falun, she won the team sprint, this time with Maiken Caspersen Falla.

In the 2015–2016 season, she placed second in the Tour de Ski. In the 2018–2019 season, Østberg won the Tour de Ski with a record winning margin of 2 min 42.0 seconds down to Russian Natalya Nepryayeva.

She has previously played football for Gjøvik FK.

In November 2019, she was handed a competition ban by the Norwegian Ski Federation (NSF), for not fulfilling the NSF's health criteria. She was forced to sit out seven World Cup races, before making her return in late December, where she finished third overall in the 2019–20 Tour de Ski.

In March 2020, she suffered a stress fracture in her left heel, and missed the last two World Cup races of the season.

In November 2020 she was handed another competition ban from the NSF, for failing to fulfill the NSF's health criteria, with regards to nutritional intake.

As a consequence of the ban, she was forced to sit out the whole 2020–21 World Cup season, and missed the 2021 World Championships in Oberstdorf, Germany.

In November 2021, the competition ban was lifted. She made her comeback in the World Cup opener in Rukatunturi, Finland, where she finished 33rd in the 10 km classical race. She competed in an additional two races, with her best result being eight in Davos, Switzerland.

On December 26, 2021, she was handed a third competition ban by the NSF. The NSF head physician, Øystein Andersen, said in a press briefing that the medical results from the three World Cup races Østberg had taken part in, showed that she couldn't handle a tougher schedule. The ban stretched over the 2021–22 Tour de Ski and the 2022 Winter Olympics.

On November 7, 2022, she was cleared to compete again, having passed the NSF's health criteria. She took part in the opening races of the 2022–23 World Cup in Rukatunturi, Finland. She finished 16th in the 10 km classical and 11th in the 20 km freestyle pursuit.

Cross-country skiing results
All results are sourced from the International Ski Federation (FIS).

Olympic Games
 3 medals – (2 gold, 1 silver)

World Championships
 7 medals (2 gold, 3 silver, 2 bronze)

World Cup

Season titles
 1 title – (1 overall)

Season standings

Individual podiums
 17 victories – (5 , 12 ) 
 73 podiums – (38 , 35 )

Team podiums
 10 victories – (8 , 2 ) 
 15 podiums – (11 , 4 )

References

External links
 
 

1990 births
Living people
Sportspeople from Gjøvik
Norwegian female cross-country skiers
Norwegian women's footballers
Cross-country skiers at the 2014 Winter Olympics
Cross-country skiers at the 2018 Winter Olympics
Olympic cross-country skiers of Norway
Olympic gold medalists for Norway
Olympic silver medalists for Norway
Medalists at the 2014 Winter Olympics
Medalists at the 2018 Winter Olympics
Olympic medalists in cross-country skiing
FIS Nordic World Ski Championships medalists in cross-country skiing
Tour de Ski skiers
Women's association footballers not categorized by position
Tour de Ski winners